Live or Let Die may refer to:

 To Live or Let Die, a 1982 short documentary film
 "Live or Let Die" (CSI: NY), an episode of CSI: NY

See also
 Live and Let Die (disambiguation)